Bronisław Knaster (22 May 1893 – 3 November 1980) was a Polish mathematician; from 1939 a university professor in Lwów and from 1945 in Wrocław.

He is known for his work in point-set topology and in particular for his discoveries in 1922 of the hereditarily indecomposable continuum or pseudo-arc and of the Knaster continuum, or buckethandle continuum. Together with his teacher Hugo Steinhaus and his colleague Stefan Banach, he also developed the last diminisher procedure for fair cake cutting.

Knaster received his Ph.D. degree from University of Warsaw in 1925, under the supervision
of Stefan Mazurkiewicz.

See also 
Knaster–Tarski theorem
Knaster–Kuratowski fan
Knaster's condition

References

1893 births
1990 deaths
People from Warsaw Governorate
University of Paris alumni
Warsaw School of Mathematics
Topologists
Recipients of the State Award Badge (Poland)